Isotrias buckwelli is a species of moth of the family Tortricidae. It is found in Morocco.

References

Moths described in 1954
Polyorthini